Chris Else (born 1942) is the New Zealand author of novels, collections of short stories, and poems.

Biography 
Born in Cottingham, Yorkshire in the United Kingdom, Chris Else emigrated to New Zealand in 1956.

He was educated at Auckland Grammar School and the University of Auckland.

Else has worked in teaching, bookselling and data-processing.  Currently he is a literary agent, technical writing consultant and partner with his wife and fellow novelist, Barbara Else, in a Wellington editorial agency, TFS Literary Agency and Manuscript Assessment Service, which among other contributions is credited by Alan Duff for ‘visionary advice’ in the acknowledgments to Once Were Warriors.

While he was at the Auckland Teachers' Training College, he was awarded the 64 Literature Cup in successive years, 1965 and 1966.

In 2005, he was elected President of The New Zealand Society of Authors (Pen NZ).

In 2007, he was appointed Chairman of Directors of Copyright Licensing Limited and in that year also was Writer in Residence at King's College, Auckland.

In 2011, Else was awarded the Autumn Residency at the Michael King Writers’ Centre in Devonport, Auckland, to work on a major new novel which explores how New Zealand society began to change in the 1960s and 1970s .

Literary works

Novels 
Dates given record the date of first publication:
 1992. Why Things Fall, Tandem Press 
 1998. Brainjoy, Tandem Press  
 2001. The Beetle in the Box, Random House (Vintage) 
 2004. On River Road, Random House (Vintage) 
 2007. Black Earth White Bones, Random House (Vintage) 
 2008. Gith, Random House (Vintage)
 2019. Waterline, Quentin Wilson Publishing

Stories 
 1981. Dreams of Pythagoras, Voice Press
 1997. Endangered Species, Hazard Press

References 
'Chris Else' in The Oxford Companion to New Zealand Literature, ed. Roger Robinson and Nelson Wattie (1998)

External links 
 New Zealand Literature File, with complete list of Works By and Works About
 New Zealand Book Council
 Elseware
 Ventiak.com

1942 births
People educated at Auckland Grammar School
Living people
New Zealand male novelists
New Zealand male poets
New Zealand male short story writers
People from Cottingham, East Riding of Yorkshire
20th-century New Zealand novelists
21st-century New Zealand novelists
20th-century New Zealand short story writers
21st-century New Zealand short story writers
20th-century New Zealand male writers
21st-century New Zealand male writers